Sam Catlin is an American television writer, director, and producer. He is the showrunner of AMC's Preacher, and previously worked as a writer/producer on Breaking Bad. He has been nominated for a Writers Guild of America (WGA) Award for his work on the series.

Biography
Catlin began writing for television in 2005 for the television film The Great New Wonderful. He then became a writer and story editor for the first season of Kidnapped in 2006. He wrote the episode "Front Page". In 2007, he became an executive story editor and writer for the short-lived series Canterbury's Law and wrote the episode "Baggage".

Catlin joined the crew of Breaking Bad in 2009 as a co-producer and writer for the second season. He wrote the second-season episodes "Down" and "4 Days Out". The second season writing staff were nominated for the WGA award for best drama series at the February 2010 ceremony for their work on the second season. Catlin was promoted to supervising producer for the third season in 2010. He was promoted again to co-executive producer for the fourth season in 2011.

In 2013, Catlin signed with Sony Pictures Television to help develop original projects, while becoming a co-executive producer for Fox's short-lived adaption of the Australian series of the same name, Rake.

In November 2013, it was announced that Catlin was developing a TV series based on the DC Vertigo comic book series Preacher with Seth Rogen and Evan Goldberg, that would be distributed by Sony Pictures Television. Catlin was confirmed as the showrunner in February 2014. Catlin wrote the pilot episode for the AMC series, and continues to serve as showrunner, writer and sometime director into the recently ordered third season.

In October 2021, Catlin had signed an overall deal with Apple Inc.

Catlin attended the New York University Tisch School of the Arts Graduate Acting Program, where he received his Master of Fine Arts Degree in 1998.

Filmography

Television 
Writer

Production staff

Film

References

External links

American male screenwriters
American television writers
Living people
Year of birth missing (living people)
American television producers
Tisch School of the Arts alumni
American male television writers
21st-century American male writers
21st-century American screenwriters